Tarsolepis sommeri is a moth in the family Notodontidae first described by Jacob Hübner in 1821. It is found in the oriental region.
The larvae have been recorded on Nephelium lappaceum. Adults have been observed drinking tears (lachryphagy) from mammals.

References

External links

Notodontidae
Moths of Borneo
Moths of Malaysia
Moths described in 1821